Mierzęcin  is a village in the administrative district of Gmina Wolin, within Kamień County, West Pomeranian Voivodeship, in north-western Poland.

Notable residents
Heino Heinrich Graf von Flemming (1632–1706), Field Marshal

References

Villages in Kamień County